Albert H. Walenta (born 2 October 1943) is professor for experimental physics at the University of Siegen in Germany. 

In 1986 he received the Gottfried Wilhelm Leibniz Prize by the Deutsche Forschungsgemeinschaft.

External links
 Homepage of the group Detector physics and electronics

Gottfried Wilhelm Leibniz Prize winners
Living people
20th-century German physicists
1943 births
Place of birth missing (living people)
Academic staff of the University of Siegen